Steven Jeffrey Taylor (born 18 October 1955) is an English former footballer. A forward, he scored 157 goals in 441 league games in a 15-year career in the Football League.

He began his career at Bolton Wanderers, turning professional in October 1973. He was loaned out to Port Vale in October 1975, before signing with Oldham Athletic in October 1977 for £38,000. He transferred to Luton Town in January 1979 for a £75,000 fee, before moving on to Mansfield Town for the same fee a few months later. He signed with Burnley in 1980, and helped the "Clarets" to the Third Division title in 1981–82. He switched to Wigan Athletic in 1983, before spending a brief spell with Stockport County the following year. He was signed by Rochdale in November 1984, and had a prolific two-year spell at the club, before he was bought by Preston North End for £20,000. He quickly returned to Burnley, and featured in the 1988 Football League Trophy final. He returned to Rochdale for the 1988–89 campaign, before he retired from professional football. He later had an unsuccessful time as manager of Northern Premier League club Mossley in 1993.

Playing career
Taylor was an apprentice with Bolton Wanderers, and turned professional in October 1973, with the "Trotters" lying in the Second Division under the stewardship of Jimmy Armfield. He joined Roy Sproson's Port Vale on loan in October 1975. It took until 1 November for him to earn his Third Division debut for the "Valiants"; a 1–0 win over Rotherham United at Vale Park. Seven days later he scored a brace past Sheffield Wednesday in a 3–0 victory at Hillsborough Stadium. Upon his return to Burnden Park, he helped new boss Ian Greaves to take Wanderers to a fourth-place finish in 1975–76 – they were just one point off Bristol City and West Bromwich Albion, who were both promoted. Bolton again finished fourth in 1976–77, lying just one point behind promoted Nottingham Forest.

In October 1977, Taylor signed for his hometown club Oldham Athletic for a fee of £38,000. He finished as the club's top scorer in 1977–78 with 21 goals; the "Latics" enjoyed a good season under Jimmy Frizzell, and finished eighth in the Second Division. Taylor then left Boundary Park and moved to Luton Town in January 1979 for a £75,000 fee. The "Hatters" finished two places and two points above the Second Division relegation zone in 1978–79, and Taylor only hit one goal in 20 league games at Kenilworth Road. David Pleat sold Taylor on to Mansfield Town, again for £75,000. He could not prevent Mick Jones's "Stags" from occupying the one of the Third Division relegation places in 1979–80, and did not stay on for long at Field Mill.

Taylor then was signed by Brian Miller's Burnley. He scored a hat-trick past Millwall in a 5–0 win at Turf Moor on 27 September 1980, and finished as the club's top scorer in 1980–81 with 17 goals in 47 games. He then hit 14 goals in 31 appearances in 1981–82, as the club finished as champions of the Third Division. He scored a hat-trick past Sheffield Wednesday in a 4–1 win on 1 January 1983, and another hat-trick past Charlton Athletic in a 7–1 home win on 26 February. He hit a total of 15 goals in 41 appearances in 1982–83, though this was not enough to save the club from relegation.

He joined Third Division rivals Wigan Athletic for the 1983–84 season, and finished as the club's top scorer with 10 goals. Harry McNally did not keep Taylor on at Springfield Park, and he instead started the 1984–85 campaign in the Fourth Division with Eric Webster's Stockport County. His stay at Edgeley Park was brief, and Taylor joined up with Vic Halom at Rochdale in November 1984, and scored 14 goals in 33 games in 1984–85. He then finished as the Fourth Division's joint-top scorer (with Southend United's Richard Cadette) in 1985–86 with 25 league goals. Seven goals in 13 games at the start of the 1986–87 season saw him snapped up by John McGrath at Preston North End for £20,000. The "Lilywhites" went on to win promotion out of the Fourth Division, but Taylor only featured in five league games at Deepdale. He remained in the Fourth Division and returned to Burnley after former boss Brian Miller was re-appointed as manager. He hit six goals in 54 games in 1987–88, and featured in the 1988 Football League Trophy final at Wembley, which ended in a 2–0 defeat to Wolverhampton Wanderers. He made four appearances in 1988–89, before returning to Spotland. He hit four goals in 17 league appearances in his second spell for "Dale", and left the Football League in summer 1989.

Managerial career
After over four years out of the game, Taylor was appointed manager of Northern Premier League
Division One side Mossley in August 1993. He left after just one win in 13 games. While manager of Mossley he played four times, scoring once. The club went on to finish the 1993–94 season in 17th place.

Career statistics
Source:

Honours
Burnley
Football League Third Division: 1981–82
Football League Trophy runner-up: 1988

Preston North End
Football League Fourth Division second-place promotion: 1986–87

References

1955 births
Living people
People from Royton
English footballers
Footballers from Oldham
Association football forwards
Bolton Wanderers F.C. players
Port Vale F.C. players
Oldham Athletic A.F.C. players
Luton Town F.C. players
Mansfield Town F.C. players
Burnley F.C. players
Wigan Athletic F.C. players
Stockport County F.C. players
Rochdale A.F.C. players
Preston North End F.C. players
Mossley A.F.C. players
English Football League players
Northern Premier League players
English football managers
Mossley A.F.C. managers
Northern Premier League managers